Min Do-hee (born September 25, 1994), professionally known as Dohee, is a South Korean actress and singer. She debuted in 2012 as a lead vocal of South Korean girl group Tiny-G. She made her acting debut in 2013 with tvN drama Reply 1994. In 2015, it was announced that Tiny-G taking indefinite hiatus and she later transitioned into acting.

Discography

Tiny-G

Solo artist

Filmography

Film

Television series

Web series

Variety show

Awards and nominations

References

External links 

 
 

1994 births
Living people
K-pop singers
South Korean female idols
South Korean women pop singers
South Korean dance musicians
South Korean television personalities
South Korean television actresses
South Korean film actresses
South Korean web series actresses
People from Yeosu
21st-century South Korean singers
21st-century South Korean women singers
Yeoheung Min clan